Sebastiano Vecchiola (born 23 May 1970) is a retired Italian football midfielder.

References

1970 births
Living people
Italian footballers
A.S. Sambenedettese players
A.C. Ancona players
Atalanta B.C. players
Venezia F.C. players
Delfino Pescara 1936 players
A.C. Reggiana 1919 players
Ravenna F.C. players
Genoa C.F.C. players
S.S.C. Napoli players
A.C. Mestre players
S.S. Maceratese 1922 players
Association football midfielders
Serie A players